Afroneta longispinosa is a species of sheet weaver found in the Congo. It was described by Holm in 1968.

References

Linyphiidae
Fauna of the Democratic Republic of the Congo
Spiders of Africa
Spiders described in 1968